Kalateh-ye Hajji Qazi (also Romanized as Kalāteh-ye Ḩājjī Qāẕī; also known as Kalāteh-ye Qāẕī and Chāhābād) is a village in Jolgeh-ye Musaabad Rural District, in the Central District of Torbat-e Jam County, Razavi Khorasan Province, Iran. At the 2006 census, its population was 335, in 76 families.

References 

Populated places in Torbat-e Jam County